Sean Ethan Findlay (born 5 December 2001) is a New Zealand field hockey player, who plays as a midfielder.

Personal life
Sean Findlay was born and raised in the Hawke's Bay town of Taradale, New Zealand.

Career

National teams

Under-21
Findlay debuted for the New Zealand U–21 team in 2019 at the Sultan of Johor Cup in Johor Bahru.

He was named in the 2021 squad for the FIH Junior World Cup to be held in India.

Black Sticks
In December 2020, Findlay was named in the Black Sticks squad for the first time.

Findlay made his debut for the national team in 2021, during a test series against Australia in Palmerston North. He also scored a goal in his debut match.

International goals

References

External links
 
 
 
 
 

2001 births
Living people
New Zealand male field hockey players
Male field hockey midfielders
Field hockey players at the 2020 Summer Olympics
Olympic field hockey players of New Zealand
People from Taradale, New Zealand
21st-century New Zealand people
Sportspeople from the Hawke's Bay Region
Field hockey players at the 2022 Commonwealth Games
2023 Men's FIH Hockey World Cup players